SMC 018136, also known as PMMR 37, is a red supergiant star located in the Small Magellanic Cloud. It is one of the largest stars and one of the most luminous SMC cool supergiants so far discovered, with a radius of 1,310 times that of the sun and a bolometric luminosity over 200,000 times more than Sun. If it were in the place of the Sun, its photosphere would at least engulf the orbit of Jupiter.

SMC 018136 has a spectral type M0 Ia and an effective temperature 3,575 K, although more recent papers suggest it has a slightly earlier spectral type of K4.5 Ia-Ib.

See also
List of largest stars
HV 11423
VY Canis Majoris

References 

Stars in the Small Magellanic Cloud
Tucana (constellation)
M-type supergiants
K-type supergiants
J00505609-7215060
Extragalactic stars
PMMR objects